AnimeCon, held in San Jose, California in 1991, was the fourth anime convention created in the United States, the first convention to have major backing from the anime industry, the first anime-specific convention within the state of California (which spawned many similar conventions thereafter), and the first anime-specific convention in the US to break 1,000 attendees. It also formed the genesis of Anime Expo (currently the largest anime-specific convention in North America).

Guests
Guests included Jerry Beck, Colleen Doran, Geoff Everets, Carl Macek, Ken Macklin, Johji Manabe, Leiji Matsumoto, Luke Menichelli, Haruhiko Mikimoto, Robert Napton, John O'Donnell, Toshio Okada, Katsuhiro Otomo, David Riddick, Yoshiyuki Sadamoto, Toren Smith, Kenichi Sonoda, Rick Sternbach, Jeff Thompson, Adam Warren, Robert Woodhead, Trish Ledoux and Toshifumi Yoshida.

Attendance
Attendance was officially estimated at 2,000.

Sponsors
The convention was co-sponsored by Gainax, Cal-Animage, the founders of BayCon, BAAS, and Studio Proteus.

History 
During its inaugural year, AnimeCon went deeply into debt due to severe budget overruns. Soon after, a management dispute erupted which imperiled the chance of a follow-on. Many of the staff went on to form Anime Expo, while others went on to form a rival convention, Anime America (which was canceled in 1997 and went defunct shortly thereafter). The period between late 1992 and early 1997 is sometimes referred to as the "Con Wars" by attendees and staffers of both conventions. It was typified by a number of personal attacks and allegations of sabotage on and off the Internet (and in particular on rec.arts.anime).

Although Anime Expo is, for all practical purposes, considered separate from AnimeCon, the Society for the Promotion of Japanese Animation (AX's parent organization) took control of AnimeCorp in 1992 and assumed many of its legal and financial obligations (including all debts incurred), the rights to the AnimeCon name, and existing stocks of unsold merchandise (including large numbers of the aforementioned T-shirts). Pre-registrations for the planned AnimeCon '92 were converted into Anime Expo '92 pre-registrations. AnimeCon Corporation was formally dissolved in February 1993.

Today, AnimeCon merchandise is considered a collectible item by some. Program booklets and T-shirts can still be found. AnimeCon T-shirts were sold on behalf of the SPJA during the subsequent years of AX.

San Jose would begin hosting another anime convention known as FanimeCon in 1999. Since 2004, FanimeCon has taken place at the San Jose Convention Center.

References

Recurring events established in 1991
Recurring events disestablished in 1993
1991 establishments in California
1993 disestablishments in California
Defunct anime conventions
Conventions in California